Barchaniella sacara is a moth in the family Cossidae. It is found in southern Kazakhstan, Uzbekistan and Turkmenistan.

The length of the forewings is 12–15 mm. Adults are on wing in May.

References

Natural History Museum Lepidoptera generic names catalog

Cossinae
Moths described in 1902
Moths of Asia